Chouteau County is a county located in the North-Central region of the U.S. state of Montana. As of the 2020 census, the population was 5,895. Its county seat is Fort Benton. The county was established in 1865 as one of the original nine counties of Montana, and named in 1882 after Pierre Chouteau Jr., a fur trader who established a trading post that became Fort Benton, which was once an important port on the Missouri River.

Chouteau County is home to the Chippewa-Cree tribe on the Rocky Boy Indian Reservation. It contains part of the Lewis and Clark National Forest.

Geography

Chouteau County lost half of its population from 1910 to 1930.

The land is mostly prairie. The Bear Paw Mountains rise in the eastern section and the Little Rockies and the Highwood ranges are in the southern portion. Major rivers include the Teton River, Marias River, Missouri River and the Arrow River.

Adjacent counties

 Liberty County – north
 Hill County – north
 Blaine County – east
 Fergus County – southeast
 Judith Basin County – south
 Cascade County – south
 Teton County – west
 Pondera County – northwest

Major highway
  U.S. Route 87

National protected areas
 Lewis and Clark National Forest (part)
 Upper Missouri River Breaks National Monument (part)

Politics

Demographics

2000 census
As of the 2000 United States census, there were 5,970 people, 2,226 households, and 1,613 families living in the county. The population density was 2 people per square mile (1/km2). There were 2,776 housing units at an average density of <1/km2 (1/sq mi). The racial makeup of the county was 84.00% White, 0.08% Black or African American, 14.62% Native American, 0.23% Asian, 0.10% Pacific Islander, 0.23% from other races, and 0.72% from two or more races. 0.67% of the population were Hispanic or Latino of any race. 23.9% were of German, 11.7% Norwegian, 8.2% English and 7.3% Irish ancestry. 96.0% spoke English, 2.5% Cree and 1.0% Spanish as their first language.

There were 2,226 households, out of which 34.00% had children under the age of 18 living with them, 60.90% were married couples living together, 8.40% had a female householder with no husband present, and 27.50% were non-families. 24.90% of all households were made up of individuals, and 10.60% had someone living alone who was 65 years of age or older. The average household size was 2.59 and the average family size was 3.11.

The county population contained 28.80% under the age of 18, 6.50% from 18 to 24, 24.10% from 25 to 44, 23.10% from 45 to 64, and 17.50% who were 65 years of age or older. The median age was 39 years. For every 100 females there were 100.80 males. For every 100 females age 18 and over, there were 97.10 males.

The median income for a household in the county was $29,150, and the median income for a family was $32,399. Males had a median income of $22,080 versus $19,318 for females. The per capita income for the county was $14,851. About 16.50% of families and 20.50% of the population were below the poverty line, including 29.30% of those under age 18 and 8.40% of those age 65 or over.

2010 census
As of the 2010 United States census, there were 5,813 people, 2,294 households, and 1,560 families living in the county. The racial makeup of the county was 75.8% white, 21.8% American Indian, 0.4% Asian, 0.1% Pacific islander, 0.1% black or African American, 0.3% from other races, and 1.6% from two or more races. Those of Hispanic or Latino origin made up 1.6% of the population. In terms of ancestry, 27.6% were German, 13.0% were Irish, 11.2% were English, 9.8% were Norwegian, and 2.0% were American.

Of the 2,294 households, 31.2% had children under the age of 18 living with them, 52.3% were married couples living together, 10.1% had a female householder with no husband present, 32.0% were non-families, and 29.1% of all households were made up of individuals. The average household size was 2.48 and the average family size was 3.04. The median age was 41.5 years.

The median income for a household in the county was $41,064 and the median income for a family was $50,201. Males had a median income of $33,866 versus $25,077 for females. The per capita income for the county was $20,202. About 14.8% of families and 21.0% of the population were below the poverty line, including 33.6% of those under age 18 and 6.2% of those age 65 or over.

Economy
Chouteau County is the state's largest winter wheat producer. It is located in the heart of the "Golden Triangle", which produces about 45% of Montana's annual wheat crop.

Communities

City
 Fort Benton (county seat)

Towns
 Big Sandy
 Geraldine

Census-designated places

 Boneau
 Carter
 Floweree
 Highwood
 Loma
 Parker School
 Rocky Boy West
 Square Butte
 Sunnybrook Colony
 Twin Hills Colony

Unincorporated communities

 Big Sag
 Coal Banks Landing
 Lippard
 Shepherd Crossing
 Shonkin
 Stranahan
 Virgelle
 Warrick
 Woods Crossing

See also
 List of lakes in Chouteau County, Montana
 List of mountains in Chouteau County, Montana
 National Register of Historic Places listings in Chouteau County, Montana

References

External links

 

 
Montana counties on the Missouri River
1865 establishments in Montana Territory
Populated places established in 1865